White Man Mountain is a mountain located in the Catskill Mountains of New York south-southwest of Grand Gorge. Hack Flats is located east of White Man Mountain and Red Mountain is located south.

References

Mountains of Delaware County, New York
Mountains of New York (state)